SS City of Pretoria was a British cargo steamship. She was torpedoed and sunk in the Second World War with heavy loss of life.

Career
She was built by Cammell Laird & Co Ltd, at their yards in Birkenhead in 1937. She was operated by Ellerman & Bucknall Steamship Co. Ltd and registered in London. She continued to be operated by Ellerman Lines in the Second World War, making at least one voyage early in the war carrying materiel from New York to France.

Her Chief Officer from 6 August 1939 to 16 August 1939 was Captain Alfred George Freeman who went on to captain several Ellerman Lines ships including SS City of Singapore and a newer SS City of Pretoria from 29 November 1950 to 26 November 1960.

Her final voyage took her from New York, which she departed on 27 February 1943, bound for Liverpool via Holyhead. She was carrying 7,032 tons of general cargo and 145 passengers and crew. Her master was Frank Deighton. Her high speed meant that it was deemed an acceptable risk to sail unescorted rather than in a convoy.

Sinking
The U-boat torpedoed the City of Pretoria, causing her to explode and sink northwest of the Azores. All aboard her, including her master, 108 crew, 24 DEMS gunners, five apprentices and seven passengers were lost with her. The passengers were "Distressed British Seamen" (DBS) being repatriated to the UK because their former ships had been sunk.

References

1937 ships
Maritime incidents in March 1943
Ships built on the River Mersey
Ships lost with all hands
Ships of the Ellerman Lines
Ships sunk by German submarines in World War II
Steamships of the United Kingdom
World War II merchant ships of the United Kingdom
World War II shipwrecks in the Atlantic Ocean